A Grandmother's Story, also known as Au pays des Jouets, is a 1908 French short silent film by Georges Méliès. It was sold by Méliès's Star Film Company and is numbered 1314–1325 in its catalogues.

The child in the film is played by Méliès's son, André Méliès, who was seven years old at the time. The film's special effects include stage machinery, substitution splices, multiple exposures, and dissolves.

The complete film was about 243 meters (790 feet) long, of which fragments are known to survive; some scenes in the middle of the film are presumed lost.

References

External links
 

French black-and-white films
Films directed by Georges Méliès
French silent short films